Richard Timothy Falomir is an American musician and composer, perhaps best recognized as the current drummer for the Orange County rock band The Aquabats, in which he performs under the stage name and persona of Ricky Fitness.

Biography
Prior to joining The Aquabats in 2002, Falomir was an original member of the Riverside punk rock band Assorted Jelly Beans, up until the group's disbandment in 1999. Assorted Jelly Beans reunited in 2008 and continue to play sporadically throughout southern California. In 2009, Falomir also briefly served as a touring drummer for the Los Angeles reggae group The Aggrolites, and in June 2014 played drums for C. J. Ramone on an East Coast US tour alongside fellow Aquabats guitarist Ian Fowles.

Outside of his band, Falomir works as a composer, arranger and music director for the children's television series Yo Gabba Gabba!, alongside several other members of The Aquabats including series co-creator Christian Jacobs. He has made several onscreen appearances on the series, playing both costumed monsters and as his Ricky Fitness persona. From 2012 to 2014, Falomir also portrayed Ricky Fitness in The Aquabats' cable television series The Aquabats! Super Show! and again on the series' 2019 YouTube revival The Aquabats! RadVentures!, where he also serves as a composer for many of the songs featured in the show.

Discography

Assorted Jelly Beans
Assorted Jelly Beans - Assorted Jelly Beans (1996) - drums, vocals
Assorted Jelly Beans - What's Really Going On!? (1998) - drums, vocals
Assorted Jelly Beans - WWW.Y2KTheory.EP..A.J.B..Com (1999) - drums, vocals

The Aquabats
Yo! Check Out This Ride! EP (2004) - drums
Charge!! (2005) - drums
Radio Down! (2010) - drums, vocals
Hi-Five Soup! (2011) - drums, vocals
The Aquabats! Super Show! Television Soundtrack: Volume One (2019) - drums, lead and backing vocals
Kooky Spooky...In Stereo (2020) - drums, vocals

References

External links
 

Hispanic and Latino American musicians
The Aquabats members
Living people
American rock drummers
American male television actors
Year of birth missing (living people)